San Luis, officially the Municipality of San Luis,  is a 4th class municipality in the province of Batangas, Philippines. According to the 2020 census, it has a population of 36,172 people.

History
San Luis was historically part of Taal. It was established as an independent town on August 25, 1861. However, in 1904, due to small income, the town was made a part of Taal once again, with all the barrios in existence retaining their names, while the town center (poblacion) was reverted to its Spanish-era name Balibago. On February 2, 1918, San Luis was re-established.

No reliable information could be gathered as to why the town is called San Luis. However, some people believe that it was named as such because it was established during the feast of Saint Louis.

In 1961, the barrios of Pacifico and Sampa were separated from San Luis and annexed to the new municipality of Santa Teresita.

Geography

Barangays
San Luis is politically subdivided into 26 barangays.

Climate

Demographics

In the 2020 census, San Luis had a population of 36,172.

Economy

Gallery

References

External links

[ Philippine Standard Geographic Code]

Municipalities of Batangas